Fermat's little theorem states that if p is a prime number, then for any integer a, the number  is an integer multiple of p. In the notation of modular arithmetic, this is expressed as
 

For example, if  = 2 and  = 7, then 27 = 128, and 128 − 2 = 126 = 7 × 18 is an integer multiple of 7.

 

For example, if  = 2 and  = 7, then 26 = 64, and 64 − 1 = 63 = 7 × 9 is thus a multiple of 7.

Fermat's little theorem is the basis for the Fermat primality test and is one of the fundamental results of elementary number theory. The theorem is named after Pierre de Fermat, who stated it in 1640. It is called the "little theorem" to distinguish it from Fermat's Last Theorem.

History 

Pierre de Fermat first stated the theorem in a letter dated October 18, 1640, to his friend and confidant Frénicle de Bessy. His formulation is equivalent to the following:

Fermat's original statement was 

This may be translated, with explanations and formulas added in brackets for easier understanding, as:
Every prime number [] divides necessarily one of the powers minus one of any [geometric] progression [] [that is, there exists  such that  divides ], and the exponent of this power [] divides the given prime minus one [divides ]. After one has found the first power [] that satisfies the question, all those whose exponents are multiples of the exponent of the first one satisfy similarly the question [that is, all multiples of the first  have the same property].

Fermat did not consider the case where  is a multiple of  nor prove his assertion, only stating:

(And this proposition is generally true for all series [sic] and for all prime numbers; I would send you a demonstration of it, if I did not fear going on for too long.)

Euler provided the first published proof in 1736, in a paper titled "Theorematum Quorundam ad Numeros Primos Spectantium Demonstratio" in the Proceedings of the St. Petersburg Academy, but Leibniz had given virtually the same proof in an unpublished manuscript from sometime before 1683.

The term "Fermat's little theorem" was probably first used in print in 1913 in Zahlentheorie by Kurt Hensel:

(There is a fundamental theorem holding in every finite group, usually called Fermat's little theorem because Fermat was the first to have proved a very special part of it.)

An early use in English occurs in A.A. Albert's Modern Higher Algebra (1937), which refers to "the so-called 'little' Fermat theorem" on page 206.

Further history 

Some mathematicians independently made the related hypothesis (sometimes incorrectly called the Chinese Hypothesis) that  if and only if  is prime. Indeed, the "if" part is true, and it is a special case of Fermat's little theorem. However, the "only if" part is false: For example, but 341 = 11 × 31 is a pseudoprime to base 2. See below.

Proofs 

Several proofs of Fermat's little theorem are known. It is frequently proved as a corollary of Euler's theorem.

Generalizations 

 

where  denotes Euler's totient function (which counts the integers from 1 to  that are coprime to ). Fermat's little theorem is indeed a special case, because if  is a prime number, then .

A corollary of Euler's theorem is: for every positive integer , if the integer  is coprime with  then
 
This follows from Euler's theorem, since, if , then  for some integer , and one has
 

If  is prime, this is also a corollary of Fermat's little theorem.

Euler's theorem is used with  not prime in public-key cryptography, specifically in the RSA cryptosystem, typically in the following way: if
 
In fact, the extended Euclidean algorithm allows computing the modular inverse of  modulo , that is the integer  such that  It follows that
 

On the other hand, if  is the product of two distinct prime numbers, then .

Fermat's little theorem is also related to the Carmichael function and Carmichael's theorem, as well as to Lagrange's theorem in group theory.

Converse 
The converse of Fermat's little theorem is not generally true, as it fails for Carmichael numbers. However, a slightly stronger form of the theorem is true, and it is known as Lehmer's theorem. The theorem is as follows:

If there exists an integer  such that
 
and for all primes  dividing  one has
 
then  is prime.

This theorem forms the basis for the Lucas primality test, an important primality test, and Pratt's primality certificate.

Pseudoprimes 

If it is not, then  is called a (Fermat) pseudoprime to base . The first pseudoprime to base 2 was found in 1820 by Pierre Frédéric Sarrus: 341 = 11 × 31.

Alternately, any number  satisfying the equality
 
is either a prime or a Carmichael number.

Miller–Rabin primality test 
The Miller–Rabin primality test uses the following extension of Fermat's little theorem: 

This result may be deduced from Fermat's little theorem by the fact that, if  is an odd prime, then the integers modulo  form a finite field, in which 1 modulo  has exactly two square roots, 1 and −1 modulo .

And  holds trivially for  since  is odd, for the same reason. That is why one usually chooses a random  in the interval .

Otherwise,  is a strong probable prime to base a, that is it may be prime or not. Therefore after  non-conclusive random tests, the probability that  is composite is at most 4−k, and may thus be made as low as desired by increasing .

In summary, the test either proves that a number is composite, or asserts that it is prime with a probability of error that may be chosen as low as desired. The test is very simple to implement and computationally more efficient than all known deterministic tests. Therefore, it is generally used before starting a proof of primality.

See also 

 Fermat quotient
 Frobenius endomorphism
 -derivation
 Fractions with prime denominators: numbers with behavior relating to Fermat's little theorem
 RSA
 Table of congruences
 Modular multiplicative inverse

Notes

References

Further reading 
 Paulo Ribenboim (1995). The New Book of Prime Number Records (3rd ed.). New York: Springer-Verlag. . pp. 22–25, 49.

External links 
 
 János Bolyai and the pseudoprimes (in Hungarian)
 Fermat's Little Theorem at cut-the-knot
 Euler Function and Theorem at cut-the-knot
 Fermat's Little Theorem and Sophie's Proof
 
 
 

Modular arithmetic
Theorems about prime numbers